Begonia lugonis is a species of plant in the family Begoniaceae. It is native to South and Central America  Its natural habitat is subtropical or tropical moist montane forests.

References

lugonis
Endemic flora of Ecuador
Vulnerable plants
Taxonomy articles created by Polbot